The Bells may refer to:

Film and television
The Bells (1911 film), Australian feature-length film
The Bells (1913 film), directed by Oscar Apfel
The Bells (1918 film), a lost silent drama
The Bells (1926 film), directed by James Young, starring Lionel Barrymore and Boris Karloff
The Bells (1931 film), directed by Harcourt Templeman and Oscar Werndorff
The Bells (2015 film), Indian film
"The Bells" (Game of Thrones), fifth episode of the eighth season of Game of Thrones

Music
The Bells (band), a 1970s pop vocal group
The Bells (symphony), a choral work completed in 1913 by Sergei Rachmaninoff
The Bells (Lou Reed album), 1979
The Bells (Nils Frahm album), 2009
"The Bells" (Billy Ward and His Dominoes song), a 1952 rhythm and blues song
"The Bells" (The Originals song), 1969
The Bells, a choral work by Eric Ewazen, 1982
"The Bells", a song by Fluke, 1991
"The Bells", a 1996 techno track produced and recorded by Jeff Mills inspired on Amiga Olga Portuguese show "bell man"
"The Bells", a song by Pedro the Lion from their 1998 album It's Hard to Find a Friend

Other uses
The Bells (play), an 1871 play by Leopold Davis Lewis
"The Bells" (poem), an 1849 poem by Edgar Allan Poe
The Bells (Aalto), an oil painting by Ilmari Aalto

See also
Bell (disambiguation)
Bells (disambiguation)
The Bell (disambiguation)